Parosphromenus is a genus of gouramies native to freshwater in Southeast Asia. All species are highly specialized peat swamp inhabitants native to southeast Asia, and the males are usually brightly colored in breeding dress; however, their need for soft, acidic water and live food prohibits the genus from becoming popular aquarium fish.

Species
The currently recognized species are:
 Parosphromenus alfredi Kottelat & P. K. L. Ng, 2005
 Parosphromenus allani B. Brown, 1987
 Parosphromenus anjunganensis Kottelat, 1991
 Parosphromenus barbarae 
 Parosphromenus bintan Kottelat & P. K. L. Ng, 1998
 Parosphromenus deissneri (Bleeker, 1859) (licorice gourami)
 Parosphromenus filamentosus Vierke, 1981 (spiketail gourami)
 Parosphromenus gunawani I. Schindler & Linke, 2012
 Parosphromenus harveyi B. Brown, 1987
 Parosphromenus juelinae Shi, Guo, Haryono, Hong, & Zhang, 2021
 Parosphromenus kishii Shi, Guo, Haryono, Hong, & Zhang, 2021
 Parosphromenus linkei Kottelat, 1991
 Parosphromenus nagyi Schaller, 1985
 Parosphromenus opallios Kottelat & P. K. L. Ng, 2005
 Parosphromenus ornaticauda Kottelat, 1991
 Parosphromenus pahuensis Kottelat & P. K. L. Ng, 2005
 Parosphromenus paludicola Tweedie, 1952
 Parosphromenus parvulus Vierke, 1979
 Parosphromenus phoenicurus I. Schindler & Linke, 2012
 Parosphromenus quindecim Kottelat & P. K. L. Ng, 2005
 Parosphromenus rubrimontis Kottelat & P. K. L. Ng, 2005
 Parosphromenus sumatranus Klausewitz, 1955
 Parosphromenus tweediei Kottelat & P. K. L. Ng, 2005

References

 
Macropodusinae
 
Freshwater fish genera
Taxa named by Pieter Bleeker
Taxonomy articles created by Polbot